The Miss Pennsylvania's Outstanding Teen competition is the pageant that selects the representative for the Commonwealth of Pennsylvania in the Miss America's Outstanding Teen pageant. The pageant is held each June at the Hillman Center for Performing Arts in Pittsburgh, Pennsylvania.

Jersey Gianna Smith of Carmichaels was crowned Miss Pennsylvania's Outstanding Teen on June 16, 2022 at the Appell Center for Performing Arts in York, Pennsylvania. She competed for the title of Miss America's Outstanding Teen 2023 at the Hyatt Regency Dallas in Dallas, Texas on August 12, 2022 where she was 2nd runner-up for the Teens in Action award.

Results summary
The following is a visual summary of the past results of Miss Pennsylvania's Outstanding Teen titleholders presented in the table below. The year in parentheses indicates year of the Miss America's Outstanding Teen competition in which the placement and/or award was garnered.

Placements
 1st runners-up: Julia Rae Schlucter (2009), Cecilia Petrush (2019)
 2nd runners-up: Elena LaQuatra (2008)
 Top 8: Page Mackenzie Weinstein (2015)
 Top 10: Jocelyn Gruber (2011), Riley Evans (2020)
 Top 11: Alysa Bainbridge (2017), Jaylen Baron (2022)

Awards

Preliminary awards
 Preliminary Evening Wear/On Stage Question: Elena LaQuatra (2008)
 Preliminary Talent: Cecilia Petrush (2019), Riley Evans (2020)

Non-finalist awards
 Non-finalist Evening Wear/On Stage Question: Katie Schreckengast (2014)
 Non-finalist Interview: Katie Schreckengast (2014)
 Non-finalist Talent: Tawni Darby (2007), Samantha Renck (2016)

Other awards
 Miss Congeniality/Spirit of America: Julia Rae Schlucter (2009)
 America's Choice: Alysa Bainbridge (2017)
 Children's Miracle Network (CMN) Miracle Maker Award: Page Mackenzie Weinstein (2015), Alysa Bainbridge (2017)
 Community Service Award: Katie Schreckengast (2014)
 Outstanding Achievement in Academic Life: Kaitlynne Kline (2012)
 Outstanding Dance Award: Samantha Renck (2016)
 Overall Vocal Talent: Cecilia Petrush (2019)
 Teens in Action Award 2nd Runner-up: Jersey Gianna Smith (2023)
 Teens in Action Award Finalists: Samantha Renck (2016), Madison Dompkosky (2018), Jaylen Baron (2022)
 Top Advertisement Sales Media Scholarship: Page Weinstein (2015), Madison Dompkosky (2018), Cecilia Petrush (2019)
Top Interview Award: Jaylen Baron (2022) (tie)

Winners

References

External links
 https://misspa.org/

Pennsylvania
Pennsylvania culture
Women in Pennsylvania
Annual events in Pennsylvania
Events in Pittsburgh